N27 may refer to:

Roads
 Route nationale 27, in France
 N27 road (Ireland)
 Nebraska Highway 27, in the United States

Other uses 
 N27 (Long Island bus)
 Akhet (hieroglyph)
 Bradford County Airport, in Bradford County, Pennsylvania, United States
 Kadoma-minami Station, of the Osaka Metro
 London Buses route N27
 Nieuport 27, a French First World War fighter aircraft